Guangdong Radio and Television, commonly known as GRT, is a broadcasting company based in Guangdong, China. The company is operating 9 radio channels, 12 free-to-air and 10 pay television channels. The company is owned by the Guangdong provincial government. The company is based in Guangzhou, Guangdong. The GRT compete ratings with local municipal broadcasters (e.g. Guangzhou Broadcasting Network) and Hong Kong's TVB network in the province.

History

GRT was formed on 23 April 2014 after the merge of Guangdong Television (GDTV), Radio Guangdong, Southern Media Corporation, and Television Southern (TVS).

Television

Radio

References

Television networks in China
Television channels and stations established in 2014
Mass media in Guangzhou
2014 establishments in China
Television in China